Winnie or Winny may refer to:

People
 Winnie (name), various persons with the given name
 David Winnie (born 1966), Scottish former association football player and manager

Entertainment
Winnie-the-Pooh, a fictional teddy bear created by A. A. Milne
Winnie Mandela (film), a 2011 Canadian film about Winnie Mandela, originally titled Winnie
Winnie (2017 film), a South African biographical documentary film about Winnie Mandela
the title character of the Winnie the Witch children's picture book series by Valerie Thomas 
 Gwendolyne "Winnie" Cooper, a character on the television show The Wonder Years
Winnie, a character in the Hotel Transylvania movie series

Places in the United States
Winnie, Texas, a census-designated place
Winnie, Virginia, an unincorporated community

Other uses
Tropical Storm Winnie (disambiguation)
Winnie (hard disk), a colloquial term for hard disk used in the past
Winnie (website), an application that helps parents go places with their children 
 Winnie, one of a pair of British cross-Channel guns in the Second World War near Dover, the other being named Pooh
 Winnipeg the Bear, known as Winnie, a Canadian black bear at the London Zoo in the 1920s
 Winnie (feline), a supposed big cat sighted in the Netherlands in 2005 
 Winny, a Japanese peer-to-peer program
 Coty Award for womenswear, popularly nicknamed Winnie

See also 
 Wini (disambiguation)